Anthony James Giarratano (born November 29, 1982) is an Italian-American former Major League Baseball shortstop who played for the Detroit Tigers in 2005.

College career
A native of Queens, New York, Giarratano attended Tulane University, where he played college baseball for the Green Wave. In 2½ seasons at Tulane, Giarratano recorded a .319 batting average and drove in 111 runs. He was named a first-team freshman All-American at second base in 2001 and was a Conference USA All-Star infielder in 2003.  He was also named to the All-Tournament Team in the 2001 Conference USA Tournament, which Tulane won. In 2002, he played collegiate summer baseball with the Cotuit Kettleers of the Cape Cod Baseball League.

Professional career
Giarratano was drafted by the Detroit Tigers in the third round of the 2003 amateur entry draft. He signed with Detroit on June 30 of 2003. After working his way through the Tigers minor league system, Tony made his major league debut on June 1, 2005. Giarratano appeared in 15 games for the Detroit Tigers; he recorded 6 hits, 1 home run, 4 RBIs, and had a .143 batting average in his rookie year.

Giarratano was placed on the disabled list in August of 2006 and remained on the DL for all of the 2007 season for shoulder and knee injuries. Giarratano was progressing well and on target to be ready for 2008 spring training.  Then, in January 2008, he re-injured his throwing shoulder and was released by the Tigers on January 31, 2008.

References

External links

1982 births
Living people
Detroit Tigers players
American people of Italian descent
Italian baseball players
Tulane Green Wave baseball players
Cotuit Kettleers players
2006 World Baseball Classic players
Oneonta Tigers players
West Michigan Whitecaps players
Lakeland Tigers players
Erie SeaWolves players